The 144th Guards Yelnya Red Banner Order of Suvorov Motor Rifle Division is a motorized infantry division of the Russian Ground Forces, reestablished in 2016 with its headquarters at Yelnya, Smolensk Oblast.

The division traces its lineage back to the 32nd Rifle Division (First formation) of the Soviet Union's Red Army, first formed in 1922 and converted into the 29th Guards Rifle Division in 1942 for its actions in the Battle of Moscow during World War II. Postwar, it was stationed in the Estonian SSR and redesignated as the 36th Guards Mechanized Division in 1946 and the 36th Guards Motor Rifle Division in 1957. To perpetuate the lineage of the disbanded 8th Guards Motor Rifle Division, the 36th Guards was redesignated as the former and adopted its history in 1960. When the 8th Guards Motor Rifle Division was transferred to Central Asia in 1967, the 144th Motor Rifle Division was formed at Tallinn to replace it and redesignated as the 144th Guards Motor Rifle Division to inherit the traditions of the 36th Guards later that year.

After the withdrawal of Soviet troops from the Baltics following the dissolution of the Soviet Union, the division became part of the Russian Ground Forces and was sent to Yelnya, where it was reduced to a storage base in 1993, which disbanded during the mid-2000s. As part of a Russian military buildup in the mid-2010s, the division was reformed as the 144th Motor Rifle Division in 2016 at Yelnya, and redesignated as the 144th Guards Motor Rifle Division to become the official successor of the previous formation of the same name in 2018.

World War II
The 32nd Division's part in the battle of Moscow did not escape the notice of the Soviet high command and it was given the title 29th Guards Rifle Division and the 17th Rifle Regiment received the Order of the Red Banner. Its regiments were given new Guards unit numberings as the 87th, 90th, and 93rd Guards Rifle Regiments. In October 1944 it was moved to the Baltic area and was the first Soviet division into Riga. It ended the war as part of 10th Guards Army still in the Baltic region.

Cold War 
The 29th Guards Rifle Division was reorganised into the 36th Guards Mechanised Division, and then on 25 June 1957 the division became the 36th Guards Motor Rifle Division. Three years later, on 23 June 1960, the division was disbanded by being renamed the 8th Guards Rezhitskaya Order of Lenin Red Banner order of Suvorov Motorised Rifle Division "Major-General I.V. Panfilov". By this time, the 87th Guards Rifle Regiment had become the 282nd Guards Motor Rifle Regiment; it was dispatched to Kyrgyzstan with the division, and, many years later, eventually after the dissolution of the Soviet Union became a Kyrgyz motor rifle brigade.

On 18 February 1967, the 144th Motor Rifle Division was formed in Tallinn, Estonian SSR, Baltic Military District, replacing the 8th Guards Motor Rifle Division, which was about to transfer to Frunze, Kyrgyz SSR. Ten months later, on 23 December 1967, the division was given the traditions, honors and awards of the 36th Guards Motor Rifle Division, which had been disbanded in 1960. It was therefore renamed the 144th Guards Motor Rifle Division.

Holm 2015 and Feskov et al. 2013 list the regiments of the division in 1970 as follows:
254th Guards Motor Rifle Regiment (Tallinn, Estonian SSR) - from the 8th Guards Motor Rifle Division
482nd Motor Rifle Regiment (Klooga, Estonian SSR)
488th Motor Rifle Regiment (Klooga, Estonian SSR)
228th Tank Regiment (Keila, Estonian SSR)
450th Artillery Regiment (Klooga, Estonian SSR)
1259th Anti-Aircraft Artillery Regiment (Klooga, Estonian SSR)

Holm writes that the division was maintained as a Not Ready Division - Cadre Low Strength (US terms: Category III) - manning was 15% (2000 men).

Russian Ground Forces service 
After the fall of the Soviet Union it was withdrawn to Yelnya, Yelninsky District, Smolensk Oblast in the Moscow Military District and was reorganised as the 4944th Base for Storage of Weapons and Equipment. It was planned that in a crisis it would be capable of being brought back to up to full division strength.

The 4944th Guards Weapons and Equipment Storage Base was disbanded in 2007.

The 144th Motor Rifle Division was reformed in 2016 as part of the 20th Guards Army. By a decree of Russian President Vladimir Putin on 30 June 2018, it inherited the lineage of the 29th Guards Rifle Division and its successors.

Its reported composition in 2020 includes:
 Headquarters (Yelnya, Yelninsky District, Smolensk Oblast)
 1259th Anti-Aircraft Rocket Regiment;
 148th Reconnaissance Battalion, V/Ch 23872 (Smolensk);
 673rd Anti-Aircraft Rocket Battalion; 
 1281th Anti-Tank Artillery Battalion (Yelnya);
 150th Medical Battalion (Pochep);
 295th Engineer-Sapper Battalion (Yelnya);
 686th Signals Battalion (Smolensk);

 59th Guards Tank Regiment - "Lublin Twice Red Banner, Orders of Suvorov and Kutuzov" (Yelyna)
 254th Guards Motor Rifle Regiment named for "Alexander Matrosov" V/Ch 91704 (Zaymishche, Klintsy, Bryansk Oblast);
 488th Guards Motor Rifle Regiment - "Simferopol Red Banner, Order of Suvorov named for Sergo Ordzhonikidze," V/Ch 12721 (Klintsy);
 856th Guards Self-Propelled Artillery Regiment - "Kobrin Red Banner, Order of Bogdan Khmelnitsky", V/Ch 23857 (Pochep, Bryansk Oblast.) The Order of Bogdan Khmelnitsky was awarded in July 1945.

2022 invasion of Ukraine
When, on 24 February 2022, Russia invaded Ukraine, the unit was deployed as part of the grouping detailed to capture Ukraine's capital Kyiv by invading Ukraine from neighboring Belarus. The unit reportedly suffered heavy losses in the Kyiv campaign, and early April 2022 the campaign was disbanded altogether by Russia. The unit retreated back across the Russian and Belarusian borders and was reinforced in order to return to the front.

The 488th Motor Rifle Regiment attacked Kharkiv Oblast on 5 March 2022. By July, the unit received the honorific 'Guards' status.

In the September 2022 Ukrainian Kharkiv counteroffensive the unit again suffered heavy losses, reportedly losing at least half of its 200 T-80 tanks. The surviving members of the unit failed their objective to stop the Ukrainian army from crossing the Oskil river. It was reported on 23 September that the commander of the 144th division, Major General Oleg Yuryevich Tsokov, was wounded in Svatovo and was evacuated.

Commanders 
 - 2022 Major General Vladimir Vitalyevich Sleptsov
 2022 - Major General Oleg Yuryevich Tsokov, wounded

See also
List of infantry divisions of the Soviet Union 1917–1957

Notes

References 
John Erickson The Road to Stalingrad: Stalin's War with Germany  Phoenix Press, 2002.

External links 
 Russiandefencepolicy.com New Tank Regiment? Posted on June 13, 2019

144
Military units and formations established in 1967
Military units and formations disestablished in 1993
Military units and formations established in 2016
Infantry divisions of Russia